The wildlife of Turkey is abundant and diverse. Turkey is a large country with many geographic and climatic regions and a great diversity of plants and animals, each suited to its own particular habitat. About 1,500 species of vertebrates and 19,000 species of invertebrates have been recorded in the country. Some of the world's staple crops were first cultivated in this area and many of their wild relatives are still found here. The country acts as a crossroads for many birds during migration, connecting Europe, Asia, and the Near East.

Ecoregions

Turkey's  of land is divided into two parts by the Bosphorus, the Sea of Marmara and the Dardanelles;  European Turkey makes up only 3% of the country, with the rest being in Asia and often known as Anatolia.

The country has varied topography with fertile coastal plains contrasting with mountainous regions in the centre and eastern part of the country. The climate of Turkey also varies, with the weather systems found near the coasts contrasting with those prevailing in the interior. The Aegean and Mediterranean coasts have hot, dry summers and cool, rainy winters. The interior of the country has a continental climate with severe weather on the Anatolian plateau in winter and hot, dry summers. These large differences in climate are reflected in an extremely diverse flora and fauna.

The ecoregions of Turkey include the important terrestrial Eastern Anatolian deciduous forests and Southern Anatolian montane conifer and deciduous forests. There are also small areas of bottomland forest. Turkey includes portions of three biodiversity hotspots: the Mediterranean Basin, the Caucasus, and the Irano-Anatolian.

Flora

Turkey is home to about 11,000 species of flowering plants, a third of which are endemic to the country. This area played a key role in the early cultivation of wheat, other cereals, and various horticultural crops. The country is divided into three main floristic areas: the Mediterranean, Euro-Siberian, and  Irano-Tranian area. The flora of the European part of Turkey is similar to that of adjoining Greece. The ecoregions here include Balkan mixed forests dominated by oaks and containing Scots pine, Bosnian pine, Macedonian pine, silver fir and Norway spruce, and Aegean and Western Turkey sclerophyllous and mixed forests where some of the main species are oaks, strawberry tree, Greek strawberry tree, Spanish broom and laurel.

The Euro-Siberian area is a mountainous part of western Turkey. Here the flora transitions from the Mediterranean vegetation type to the Anatolian plateau. The dominant vegetation cover here is forests of oak and pine, especially Anatolian black pine and Turkish pine. This area is characterised by hot dry summers and cold winters. Salt steppes and lakes are found here, as well salt-free grassland areas, marshes and freshwater systems. Immediately around the large Lake Tuz and other saline areas, saltmarsh plants grow, and beyond this is a sharp divide, with the flora being dominated by members of the families Chenopodiaceae and Plumbaginaceae.

The mountainous eastern half of the country is separated floristically from the rest of the country by the Anatolian diagonal, a floral break that crosses the country from the eastern end of the Black Sea to the northeastern corner of the Mediterranean Sea. Many species found to the east of this break are not found to the west and vice versa, and about four hundred species are only found along this divide. The natural vegetation in eastern Turkey is the Eastern Anatolian deciduous forests; in these oaks such as Brant's oak, Lebanon oak, Aleppo oak and Mount Thabor's oak predominate in open woodland with Scots pine, burnet rose, dog-rose, oriental plane, alder, sweet chestnut, maple, Caucasian honeysuckle (Lonicera caucasica) and common juniper.

Fauna

Turkey has a large range of habitat types and a great faunal diversity. Nearly 1,500 vertebrate species were recorded, of which over 100 species, mostly fish, are endemic. The country is on two major routes used by migratory birds which increase in numbers during spring and autumn. The invertebrate fauna is also very diverse, with about 19,000 species being recorded including 4,000 endemics.

Fungi
There are over 12,000 varieties of mushroom in Turkey.

Threats
Threats to biodiversity include desertification due to climate change in Turkey, which is forecast to move the ecoregions northwards, and large scale infrastructure projects such as those near Istanbul. Land degradation threatens biodiversity loss, and water scarcity is also a problem. Küre and Kaçkar Mountains National Parks have been suggested for rewilding. Several marine fish and mammals have greatly declined, in part due to overfishing.

Policy
Turkey enforced the Berne Convention on the Conservation of European Wildlife and Natural Habitats from 1999, but according to one study laws and legal decisions still had some deficiencies in 2019, especially regarding migratory species and international coordination. The government plans to increase protected areas from the 9% in 2019 to 17% by 2023. Official restrictions on access to environmental information hamper biodiversity monitoring. In 2020 it was suggested that more use of remote sensing and citizen science could help to make the first complete map of the nation's land cover.

See also
Environmental issues in Turkey
List of national parks of Turkey
Wildlife of Iraq
Wildlife of Iran

References

Biota of Turkey
Turkey